The 2010 Open Barletta was a professional tennis tournament played on outdoor red clay courts. It was part of the 2010 ATP Challenger Tour. It took place in Barletta, Italy between 22 and 28 March 2010.

ATP entrants

Seeds

Rankings are as of March 8, 2010.

Other entrants
The following players received wildcards into the singles main draw:
  Alessio di Mauro
  Thomas Fabbiano
  Franko Škugor
  Filippo Volandri

The following players received entry from the qualifying draw:
  Martín Alund
  Aljaž Bedene
  Carlos Berlocq
  Alberto Brizzi

Champions

Singles

 Pere Riba def.  Steve Darcis, 6–3, ret.

Doubles

 David Marrero /  Santiago Ventura def.  Ilija Bozoljac /  Daniele Bracciali, 6–3, 6–3

References
2010 Draws

External links
Official website
ITF search 

Open Barletta
Open Città della Disfida